Edward Gay may refer to:

Edward Gay (artist), (1837–1928), Irish-born landscape painter
Edward James Gay (1816–1889), U.S. Representative from Louisiana
Edward James Gay (1878–1952), U.S. Senator from Louisiana; grandson of the elder E. J. Gay 
Edward Gay, prisoner on the ship St. Michael of Scarborough